Five-time defending champions Peter Fleming and John McEnroe successfully defended their title, defeating Pavel Složil and Tomáš Šmíd in the final, 6–2, 6–2 to win the doubles tennis title at the 1983 Masters Grand Prix.

Draw

Finals

References
1983 Masters-Doubles

Doubles